Silvia Federici (born 1942) is a scholar, teacher, and feminist activist based in New York. She is a professor emerita and teaching fellow at Hofstra University in New York State, where she was a social science professor. She also taught at the University of Port Harcourt in Nigeria. In 1972, with Mariarosa Dalla Costa and Selma James, she co-founded the International Feminist Collective, the organization that launched the campaign for Wages for Housework. In 1990, Federici co-founded the Committee for Academic Freedom in Africa (CAFA), and, with Ousseina Alidou, was the editor of the CAFA bulletin for over a decade. She was also a member of the Academic Association of Africa Scholars (ACAS) and among the voices generating support for the struggles of students across the African continent and in the United States. In 1995, in the course of the campaign to demand the liberation of Mumia Abu-Jamal, she cofounded the Radical Philosophy Association (RPA) anti-death penalty project, an organization intended to help educators become a driving force towards its abolition. From 1979 to 2003, she was a member of the Midnight Notes Collective.

For several decades, Federici has been working in a variety of projects with feminist organizations across the world like Women in Nigeria (WIN), Ni Una Menos, the Argentinian feminist organization, and Feminist research on violence in New York. For the last five years, she has been organizing a project with feminist collectives in Spain to reconstruct the history of the women, who were persecuted as witches in early modern Europe, and raise consciousness about the contemporary witch-hunts that are taking place across the world.

Federici is considered one of the leading feminist theoreticians in Marxist feminist theory, women’s history, political philosophy, and the history and theory of the commons. Her most famous book, Caliban and the Witch, has been translated in more than 20 foreign languages, and adopted in courses across the U.S. and many other countries. Often described as a counterpoint to Marx’s and Foucault’s account of “primitive accumulation,” Caliban reconstructs the history of capitalism, highlighting the continuity between the capitalist subjugation of women, the slave trade, and the colonization of the Americas. It has been described as the first history of capitalism with women at the center. Federici's work in Caliban has crystallized her reputation as a member of the Marxist and feminist theoretical canon.

Background
Federici was born in Parma, Italy, in 1942. She moved to the US in 1967 to study for a PhD in philosophy at the University at Buffalo with support from a Fulbright scholarship. She taught at the University of Port Harcourt in Nigeria, and was Associate Professor and later Professor of Political Philosophy and International Studies at New College of Hofstra University.

She was co-founder of the International Feminist Collective, and an organizer with the wages for housework campaign. In 1973, she helped start Wages for Housework groups in the US. In 1975 she published Wages Against Housework, the book most commonly associated with the wages for housework movement.

She also co-founded the Committee for Academic Freedom in Africa (CAFA), and was involved with the Midnight Notes Collective. In 1995, she co-founded the Radical Philosophy Association (RPA) anti-death penalty project.

Federici lives in Park Slope, Brooklyn, with her partner George Caffentzis.

In March 2022, Federici was amongst 151 international feminists signing Feminist Resistance Against War: A Manifesto, in solidarity with the Feminist Anti-War Resistance initiated by Russian feminists after the Russian invasion of Ukraine.

Scholarly contributions
Federici's best known work, Caliban and the Witch: Women, the Body and Primitive Accumulation, expands on the work of Leopoldina Fortunati investigating the reasons for the witch hunts of the early modern period, but giving a feminist interpretation. In it, she argues against the popular interpretation of Karl Marx's concept of primitive accumulation which is often viewed as a necessary precursor for capitalism. Instead, she posits that primitive accumulation is a fundamental characteristic of capitalism itself—that capitalism, in order to perpetuate itself, requires a constant infusion of expropriated capital.

Federici connects this expropriation to women's unpaid labour, both connected to reproduction and otherwise, which she frames as a historical precondition to the rise of a capitalist economy predicated upon wage labor. Related to this, she outlines the historical struggle for the commons and the struggle for communalism. Instead of seeing capitalism as a liberatory defeat of feudalism, Federici interprets the ascent of capitalism as a reactionary move to subvert the rising tide of communalism and to retain the basic social contract.

She situates the institutionalization of rape and prostitution, as well as the heretic and witch-hunt trials, burnings, and torture at the center of a methodical subjugation of women and appropriation of their labor. This is tied into colonial expropriation and provides a framework for understanding the work of the International Monetary Fund, World Bank, and other proxy institutions as engaging in a renewed cycle of primitive accumulation, by which everything held in common—from water, to seeds, to our genetic code—becomes privatized in what amounts to a new round of enclosures.

Publications

Books
(1975) Wages Against Housework. Bristol: Published jointly by the Power of Women Collective and the Falling Wall Press. Link goes to full text of the book.
 (1984, with Leopoldina Fortunati) Il Grande Calibano: Storia del corpo sociale ribelle nella prima fase del capitale. Milan: Franco Angeli
(2004) "Il Femminismo e il Movimento contro la guerra USA", in DeriveApprodi #24
(2004) Caliban and the Witch: Women, the Body and Primitive Accumulation. Brooklyn, NY: Autonomedia. Licensed online copy at the Internet Archive.
(2012) Revolution at Point Zero: Housework, Reproduction, and Feminist Struggle, Brooklyn/Oakland: Common Notions/PM Press. Links to full text:  epub,pdf
(2018) Re-enchanting the World: Feminism and the Politics of the Commons. Oakland, CA: Kairos/PM Press. 
(2018) Witches, Witch-Hunting, and Women. Oakland, CA: PM Press
(2020) Beyond the periphery of the skin: rethinking, remaking, reclaiming the body in contemporary capitalism. Oakland, CA: PM Press
(2021) Patriarchy of The Wage: Notes on Marx, Gender, and Feminism. Oakland, CA: PM Press.

As editor
 (1995) (ed.) Enduring Western Civilization: The Construction of the Concept of Western Civilization and Its "Others". Westport, CT, and London: Praeger.
(2000) (ed.) A Thousand Flowers: Structural Adjustment and the Struggle for Education in Africa. Africa World Press.
(2000) (eds.) African Visions: Literary Images, Political Change, and Social Struggle in Contemporary Africa. Westport, CT, and London: Praeger.

Articles
Free online access:
Feminism and the Politics of the CommonsThe Commoner, 2011
On capitalism, colonialism, women and food politics, Politics and Culture 2009 (2) - Special Issue on Food (&) Sovereignty 
Witch-Hunting, Globalization, and Feminist Solidarity in Africa Today, The Commoner, 2008
Precarious Labour: A Feminist Viewpoint, 2008
Notes on the edu–factory and Cognitive Capitalism, 2007 (with George Caffentzis)
Theses on Mass Worker and Social Capital (1972, with Mario Montano)
War, Globalization and Reproduction
Mormons in space (with George Caffentzis)
Why Feminists Should Oppose Capital Punishment
Donne, Globalizzazione e Movimento Internazionale delle Donne
The great Caliban:The struggle against the rebel body, from Caliban & the Witch
All the World Needs a Jolt: Social Movements and Political Crisis in Medieval Europe, from Caliban & the Witch
The Debt Crisis, Africa and the New Enclosures
The War in Yugoslavia. On Whom the Bombs are Falling? (1999, with Massimo De Angelis)
 "Viet Cong Philosophy: Tran Duc Thao". Telos 06 (Fall 1970). New York: Telos Press
Development and Underdevelopment in Nigeria (1985)
On Elder Care

Notes and references

External links

Silvia Federici page at Generation Online
Silvia Federici page at LibCom
Midnight Notes Collective
 Silvia Federici Papers - Pembroke Center Archives, Brown University
Tribute to Silvia Federici in The Commoner
Audio from a talk entitled "The Body, Capitalist Accumulation And The Accumulation Of Labour Power" by Silvia Federici for Bristol Radical History Group
"Academic Freedom and the Enclosure of Knowledge in the Global University" by Silvia Federici at Rhodes University in Grahamstown, South Africa. 19 September 2013.

Living people
American Marxists
American political philosophers
Women Marxists
Feminist historians
Hofstra University faculty
Marxist feminists
Autonomism
Women's historians
Feminist philosophers
American women philosophers
21st-century American historians
American women historians
1942 births
Italian emigrants to the United States
Italian Marxists
Italian feminists
20th-century Italian historians
Italian women historians
Italian women philosophers
American expatriates in Nigeria
People of Emilian descent
Italian socialist feminists
Academic staff of the University of Port Harcourt
University at Buffalo alumni
21st-century American women writers
Marxist theorists
American socialist feminists